Croatian dance traditionally refers to a series of folk-dances, the most common being the kolo. 

Croatian dance varies by region, and can be found throughout the various regions of Austria, Bosnia and Herzegovina, Croatia, Hungary, Romania, Serbia and Slovenia. The traditional kolo is a circle dance, where dancers follow each other around the circle, is relatively simple in form and widespread throughout other Slavic countries. Due to emigration, Croatian folk dance groups are prevalent throughout the diaspora, most notably the United States, Canada, Australia, and Germany.

Music is a very important part of Croatian folk dance, with of the most common instruments used are the tamburica, lijerica, jedinka, šargija, gusle, bagpipe, and accordion. Today, kolo is danced at weddings, baptisms, holidays such as Easter, and ethnic festivals.

History

The circle dance is one of the basic forms of Croatian folk dance. It is regarded as the oldest form of dance, and can be seen as an expression of community, especially in village life. Throughout a large part of Croatia right up until World War II, the kolo had been the centre of village social life. The kolo as a dance became a tool for social gathering, and was often the main place at which young women and men could get to know each other. With many dances, the singing of jocular verses during the performance served as a way to express feelings or tell a story. By singing, movement, and gestures one could express what was proscribed in ordinary speech. Many young men and women used this as an excuse for courting and teasing one another. Occasions where people may have performed a kolo outdoors on special occasions include harvests, weddings, and religious celebrations to honor a special saint. More recently, the dances are performed at weddings, concerts, festivals or ethnic celebrations.

Other european dances became popular in certain parts of the country such as the polka in the north and the furlana in Istria, due to German/Austrian and Italian influences respectively.

Kolo

Slavonia and Baranja

Often considered to be the richest and liveliest of all Croatian dancing, the dancing from Slavonia is composed of difficult steps and lively music.

Šokačko kolo 
Izvor voda izvirala
Igra kolo u dvadeset i dva
Povraćanac
Dorata
Logovac
Žita
Srce moje
Todore
Mista
Kabanica
Jabučice
Ranče
Sitne bole

Posavina
Like most northern Croatian dances, Posavina kolo is lively with plenty of singing. The Drmeš dance is one of the most popular types of kolo in Croatia, and can be seen throughout the regions.

 Drmeš
 Staro sito 
 Ženina Volja - A woman's will
 Repa
 Dučec
 Oj Savice, tija vodo ladna -

Podravina

Dances from Podravina are close to the Slavonian dances in style, which is lively with plenty of singing, which is typical for north Croatian folk dances.

Drmeš
 Grizlica
 Ples z ropčecom
 Moldovan - literally Moldovan, believed to originate from local Romani.
 Jelica kolce vodila
 Lepa Anka kolo vodi
 Rendajte se milo lane
 Tronjaka
 Sejale smo bažulka
 Na kraj sela kolo igra
 Postajale cure oko kola
 Gusta magla ti ne padaj na me
 Žena ide na gosti
 Katarena kolo vodi

Hrvatsko Zagorje

Hrvatsko Zagorje, or Croatian hinterland, is the north-central part of the country, which the capital Zagreb is a part of. Dances are lively and merry.

 Drmeš
 Nebeska
 Oberštajer
 Šroteš
 Ajnzerica - a lively dance said to have been derived from local gypsys from Marija Bistrica
 Repa
 Kriči kriči tiček
 Žena išla u gosti
 Podmostec
 Ženil se sirotek
 Dobar vecer dobri ljudi

A variation of the traditional polka:
 Puntarska polka 
 Judin polka
 Krajc polka

Međimurje

The Međimurje region is the northern-est tip of Croatia, and shares much of the merry and lively dance qualities as other nearby regions.
 
Čardaš
Došla sam vam japa dimo - derived from traditional solo songs
Kalaptanc
Kuritari
Regica
Kaj se z Jelkom pripetilo
Igrajte nam japa
Faljila se Jagica
Lepe naše senokoše
Zginula je pikuša
Šoštar polka
Žena ide na gosti
Vanjkušec
Baroš oj Barice

Istria

Dances from Istria have strong influence from Venetian culture.

 Balun
 Cotić
 Hrvaski - literally, "Croatian" dance
 Korak
 Polka
 Štajeriš

Lika

Kolo from Lika can have music and instruments, or it can be silent with no instrumental accompaniment or even singing. With the silent dances, the only sounds being made are when the feet make contact with the floor and the rhythmic clinking sound of the women's coin necklaces, and sometimes, the dancers' voices as they sing. Though not often danced these days, these silent dances are well remembered by the older Ličani and are perpetuated by folk dance performing groups.

Ličko kolo - traditional Lika dance
Tanac
Haj na lijevo
Milica
Oj Otočcu - from the town of Otočac
Perjato, Rasperjato
Okreni se, moje kolo malo
Joj, moj dragane, ti ne radi toga

Dalmatia and islands

Due to its geography and history of foreign occupation, Dalmatia has a variety of dances influenced by its history. One example is the popular dance Linđo from Dubrovnik and southern Dalmatia, which has a distinct Mediterranean influence. On the other hand, the Nijemo Kolo from the Dalmatian hinterland shows influences of the Ottoman era on the region.

 Linđo
 Nijemo Kolo 
 Potkolo - line dance done to tamburica 
 Poskacica - a couple dance done to the lijerica
 Nemigusa - a "winking" couple dance 
 Seljanica - popular 
 Vrličko kolo - from the town of Vrlika
 Baška J' Malo Selo - From the village of Baska on Krk island
 Lipa li je rumen Rožica - from the island of Murter
 Dubravačko Kolo – Poskočica - merry dance from the Dubrovnik countryside
 Dubravačko Kolenda -  A Dubrovnik carol

Bosnia and Herzegovina
Dances from Herzegovina are often a cross between Dalmatian Zagora traditions, and Ottoman influences, though much less than Bosnia proper.

 Sremica
 Vrtikolo
 O javore, javore
Koja Gora Ivo
 Na Neretvu misecina pala

Serbia (Vojvodina)

Dances from Vojvodina are most similar to the Slavonian dances in their liveliness and activity. The Bunjevci Croats from the Bačka region are renowned for their beautifully embroidered female dresses, made from real silk from France, and the rattling sound made by the dancers' boots as they dance. In the Banat region, the men have their own competitive dance.

 Šokačko kolo
 Tandračak
 Bunjevačko momačko kolo - literally the Bunjevac men's kolo, where one man dances with two women
 Momacko nadigravanje - the men's competitive dance
 Kolo Igra, Tamburica Svira
 Malo kolo
 Podvikuje Bunjevačka Vila

Hungary and Romania

Croatian kolo from Hungary is mainly concentrated in the southern region near Baranja, while in Romania, it is in the Banat region. Due to Hungarian influence, the Csárdás remains one of the most popular dances among all ethnic groups.

 Tanac
 Šokadija
 Predgovor 
 Dunje ranke 
 Ranče 
 Todore
 Kratka drmavica 
 Tandrčak 
 Ide snaša
 Maricce kolo 
 Na dvi strane kolo 
 Jabuke 
 Romanska 
 Kukunješće 
 Rotkve 
 Trojanac 
 Devojče, Radojče 
 Pačići 
 Kolo 
 Narodne nošnje

Other dance

On the island of Korčula in the Adriatic, the popular sword dance, the Moreška is still prevalent and performed at festivals and special events.

In the nineteenth century, a new form of ballroom dancing emerged in Croatia. Elements of European ballroom spread throughout the region, and dances such as the polka soon became widespread all throughout the Croatian regions. Croatian ballroom dancing, or salonsko kolo, emerged in the nineteenth century as a result of the above influences. Due to the Croatian national revival and re-awakening of Croatian culture and national identity, an effort was made to incorporate traditional music and dances into the urban dance revival. Thus, the intellectual idealists saw kolo as a quintessential Slavic dance, and chose to adopt it for the urban context it It was at this time that the hrvatsko kolo emerged as a choreographed dance.

Due to the strong Venetian/Italian influence in Istria and parts of Dalmatia, the furlana has become a part of the culture of the people, most especially in Vodnjan. A specific strain on the furlana song is called the "Polesana", and is thought to originate from Istria; either from the Italian word for "a woman from Pula", or from the Croatian word "", meaning "rural".

Since the Burgenland Croats from Austria have been under the influence of German/Austrian and Hungarian cultures, they formed their own dance traditions, influenced by the liveliness of the polka and the csárdás. An example is the 'Filež dance' from Nikitsch, which is light-hearted and cheerful, with dancers often bringing in props to the dance, like a broom or a bottle.

Costume

Many Croatian dances have the participants wearing a national costume. National costumes, or folk dresses, vary from region to region in style, design, color, material, shape and form. Thus, each region's national dress expresses an identity related to the geographic area it comes from, much like the kolo dance.

See also
Croatian music
 National Folk Dance Ensemble of Croatia LADO

References

Further reading

External links
 National Folk Dance Ensemble of Croatia
 Croatian Folklore Ensemble
 Zagreb Folk Ensemble
 Tanac Folk Dance Ensemble in Hungary
 Sword dances in Croatia

 
Dances
Dances